WUSP-LD, virtual channel 25 (UHF digital channel 15), is a low-powered CTNi-affiliated television station licensed to Ponce, Puerto Rico. The station is owned by Senda Educational Broadcasting, a subsidiary of the Christian Television Network. WUSP-LD's transmitter is located in Cerro Maravilla.

Digital television

Digital channels
The station's digital signal is multiplexed:

References

External links

USP-LD
Television channels and stations established in 2014
2014 establishments in Puerto Rico
Low-power television stations in the United States
Christian Television Network affiliates
Christian television stations in Puerto Rico